Moschato is a suburb in the southwestern part of the Athens agglomeration, Greece. Since the 2011 local government reform it is part of the municipality Moschato-Tavros, of which it is the seat and a municipal unit.

Geography

Moschato is situated on the Phaleron Bay coast, east of the mouth of the river Cephissus. The municipal unit has an area of 2.325 km2. It is 6 km southwest of Athens city centre and 3 km east of Piraeus. The southern end of Motorway 1 (Athens - Thessaloniki) is in Moschato. Other important roads are Poseidonos Avenue along the coast and Peiraios Street in the north. The main squares of Moschato are Metamorfoseos Sotiris Square on Makrygianni Avenue, with the eponymous church, and Iroon Polytechneiou Square with the City Hall.

Transport

The Moschato metro station is served by Athens Metro Line 1, which connects it with Piraeus and central Athens. Moschato is also served by the Athens Tram network, and by the bus routes 914, 860, 229, 217, 101, B1, 500, 130, 049, 040, 232, 218, C1, 420 and A1.

Culture

The local fair is held on 6 August every year, festivities starting from the 5th, when the cathedral of Aghia Sotira (Our Christ Saviour) has its religious holiday.

Moschato is known for its Carnival celebrations held every year approximately two weeks before Clean Monday (Kathara Deytera). Festivities for all ages are held throughout the town and more specific at the Tent (Tenta) that the municipal puts up at the Korai Str. square. Delegations from many cities across Greece as well as foreign communities take part in this two week festivity. Teenagers have the opportunity to take part in a large Treasure/Scavenger Hunt (Kinigi toy Chamenou Thisavrou) which takes place in all of Moschato and lasts for the entire two weeks, engaging into games, singing contests, citywide treasure hunts, masquerade competitions and with the chance of winning prizes, trips and many other gifts.

Historical population

References

External links
Moschato Directory
Photos of Moschato
The City of Moschato
Moschato City Forum

Populated places in South Athens (regional unit)